Listed here are the monarchs who reigned over Canada, starting with the French colony of Canada, which subsequently became a British colony, followed by the British Dominion of Canada, and, finally, the present-day sovereign state of Canada. The date of the first claim by a monarch over Canada varies, with most sources giving the year as 1497, when John Cabot made landfall somewhere on the North American coast (likely either modern-day Newfoundland or Nova Scotia) and claimed the land for England on behalf of King Henry VII. However, some sources, instead, put this date at 1535, when the word Canada was first used to refer to the French colony of Canada, which was founded in the name of King Francis I. Monarchical governance subsequently evolved under a continuous succession of French, British, and eventually uniquely Canadian sovereigns. Since the first claim by Henry VII, there have been 33 sovereigns of Canada, including two sets of co-sovereigns.

While Canada became a Dominion within the British Empire upon Confederation in 1867, the concept of a fully independent Canada sharing the person of the sovereign with the United Kingdom and other countries, such as Australia and New Zealand, only emerged gradually over time through constitutional convention, and was officially confirmed with the passage of the Statute of Westminster in 1931. Since then, the Canadian Crown has been legally distinct from those of the other Commonwealth realms, with its own separate and distinct monarch. Although the term king of Canada was used as early as the beginning of the reign of George VI, it was not until 1953 that the monarch's title was made official, with Elizabeth II being the first monarch to be separately proclaimed as Queen of Canada, as per the Royal Style and Titles Act.

Sovereigns of Canada

The French Crown (1534–1763)

The English and British Crowns (1497–1931)

The Canadian Crown (1931–present)
In 1931 the Canadian Crown emerged as an independent entity from that of the British Crown due to the Statute of Westminster 1931.

Consorts
The Canadian monarch's consort—his or her spouse—has no constitutional status or power, but is a member of the Canadian royal family. In the United Kingdom, all female consorts have had the right to and have held the title of queen consort; as Canada does not have laws or letters patent under the Great Seal of Canada laying out the styles of any royal family members besides the monarch, royal consorts are, as a courtesy, addressed in Canada using the style and title as they hold in the UK. After informal discussions among the various Commonwealth prime ministers between 1954 and 1957, it was decided that the Duke of Edinburgh, husband of Elizabeth II, would not be granted the title of prince consort.

Since Confederation, two sovereigns have reigned over Canada without a consort: Victoria, whose husband, Albert, died before Confederation, and Edward VIII, who married Wallis Simpson after his abdication.

See also

 Constitutional history of Canada
 History of monarchy in Canada
 History of Canada
 List of governors general of Canada
 List of current heads of state and government
 Timeline of Canadian history

Notes

References

External links
 Government of Canada: The Kings and Queens of Canada: The Crown in Canadian History
 Senate of Canada: Canada, A Constitutional Monarchy

Monarchy in Canada
Lists of monarchs
Lists of queens
Heads of state of Canada